Starford is an unincorporated community in Indiana County, Pennsylvania, United States. Starford has a post office, with ZIP code 15777, which opened on March 14, 1905.

References

Unincorporated communities in Indiana County, Pennsylvania
Unincorporated communities in Pennsylvania